Sureserve Group plc (formerly Lakehouse plc) is a UK-based asset and energy support services group. It was founded in 1988, with headquarters in Dartford, Kent. In October 2018, it employed around 2,000 staff in 23 UK offices.

The group offered services in regeneration, compliance, energy services, and construction to the housing, education, public and commercial buildings sectors, with a focus on the UK public sector and regulated markets, before disposing of its property services and construction business in August 2018. This company, Lakehouse Contracts, subsequently went into administration and ceased trading in March 2019, owing £27m to 275 creditors.

History 
Steve Rawlings founded Lakehouse in 1988 and remained chief executive until 2014.

Lakehouse floated on the London Stock Exchange in March 2015.

Ric Piper joined the Lakehouse board in 2016 as chairman. Shortly afterwards, Piper was replaced by Bob Holt, who was appointed as director and executive chairman.

Between 2011 and 2015 Lakehouse acquired ten complementary businesses to expand geographically and provide broader services. In 2011 Lakehouse acquired gas compliance services provider K&T Heating. In 2012 it acquired fire compliance business Allied Protection. Foster Property Maintenance was acquired in 2013. In 2014 it acquired energy services provider Everwarm, who also install electric vehicle charging infrastructure and solar PV systems. and water and air compliance services provider H2O Nationwide. In 2015 it acquired smart metering specialists Providor, energy services broker and energy management service provider Orchard Energy, gas compliance services businesses Sure Maintenance and Aaron Heating, and lift compliance services provider Precision Lifts.

In July 2017, Lakehouse confirmed that its fire compliance business, Allied Protection, was engaged by Royal Borough of Kensington and Chelsea in January 2017 to certify installed fire safety systems in Grenfell Tower, destroyed by a large fire on 14 June 2017. Allied was satisfied the system was maintained in accordance with the requirements and all evidence presented to date indicates that it performed as it was designed to do. Allied was however not responsible for the specification of the system.

On 1 October 2018, Lakehouse announced it had changed its name to Sureserve Group plc. In October 2018, ten people were charged as part of a fraud investigation relating to two contracts between Lakehouse and Hackney Homes relating to work in 2013-2014, though there is no suggestion of fraud on Lakehouse's part.

After five years at Sureserve, during which time he was credited with turning round the formerly struggling business, Bob Holt stepped down as chairman and CEO in March 2021.

Lakehouse Contracts
In August 2018, Lakehouse sold its construction and property services operations, Lakehouse Contracts, employing 236 staff, for £500,000 to a newly formed company, Mapps Group Limited. In January 2019, Sureserve announced it had set aside £2.5m for possible claims on projects carried out by the new business and had written off the £500,000 sale price to zero "in light of the weak performance of the activities since." In March 2019, Lakehouse Contracts entered administration and ceased trading.

Claiming to be owed "millions", subcontractors affected by the administration planned to attend Sureserve's AGM on 19 March 2019. In April 2019, one subcontractor, Target Structural, said it was seeking £376,000 from Sureserve following an adjudication in its favour relating to a bathroom pod replacement contract in Enfield. In May 2019, it was reported Lakehouse had collapsed owing more than £9 million to hundreds of subcontractors; in August 2019, administrator CMB Partners confirmed 275 creditors were owed more than £27m. In June 2019, Sureserve said it had set aside £5.4m in provisions following the sale and subsequent collapse of the Lakehouse business.

The conduct of Lakehouse directors was the subject of a CMB report to the government; investigations continued into the sale of subsidiary Fosters Property Maintenance, sold for £1 despite having a balance sheet value of £3.6m.

Awards 
 Building Contractor of the year 2010
 Lord Mayor’s Dragon Award 2011
 Building Diversity Champion of the Year 2011
 Responsible Business of the Year Community 2013
 Building Contractor of the year 2013
 Constructing Excellence Supply Chain of the Year 2013
 Construction Marketing Awards 2014 Best Branding and Positioning and Marketing Team of the Year
 Housing Excellence Customer Service Award 2015

References

External links 
 Sureserve website

Construction companies based in London
Companies listed on the London Stock Exchange
Companies listed on the Alternative Investment Market
Business services companies of the United Kingdom
Business services companies established in 1988
1988 establishments in England
Charging stations
Solar energy companies of the United Kingdom
British companies established in 1988
Construction and civil engineering companies established in 1988